George Fillmore Swain (2 March 1857, San Francisco, California – 1 July 1931) was a civil engineer from the United States. He was a professor at the Massachusetts Institute of Technology (MIT) and later at Harvard University.

Biography
He was graduated at the Massachusetts Institute of Technology in 1877 and then studied in Berlin, Germany, for three years. On his return to the United States, he settled in Boston.  In 1887 he became professor of civil engineering at the Massachusetts Institute of Technology, which was then located in Boston.  He remained at MIT until 1909, when he became professor of civil engineering at the Harvard Graduate School of Applied Science. He also served as consulting engineer of the Massachusetts Railroad Commission, and in 1894 became a member of the Boston Transit Commission, becoming its chairman in 1913.

Works
 Notes on Hydraulics (1885)
 “Report on the Water Power of the Atlantic Watershed” in Vol. XVII of the Tenth United States Census
 Notes on Theory of Structures (1893)
 
 Conservation of Water by Storage (1915)
 How to Study (1917)

Notes

References

External links

Archives and records
George F. Swain papers at Baker Library Special Collections, Harvard Business School.

1857 births
1931 deaths
American civil engineers
People from Massachusetts
Massachusetts Institute of Technology alumni
MIT School of Engineering faculty
John A. Paulson School of Engineering and Applied Sciences faculty
Members of the United States National Academy of Sciences